Warren Bennett (born 20 August 1971) is an English professional golfer.

Career
Bennett was born in Ashford, Surrey and is the son of former footballer Peter Bennett. In 1994, he won the Australian Amateur and was the leading amateur at  The Open Championship. He turned professional later that year.

Bennett failed to win a European Tour card at Qualifying School in either 1994 or 1995, and missed much of 1996 with a twisted vertebrae.

In 1998, he headed the second tier Challenge Tour rankings having won five tournaments during the season, increasing his career tally at that level to seven. From 1999 to 2004 he played on the European Tour, winning his only European Tour title at the 1999 Scottish PGA Championship, but he continued to be troubled by injuries. In 2005, he played only a few events, most of them on the Challenge Tour. Bennett's best year-end ranking on the European Order of Merit was 29th in 2001.

Having suffered a hand injury in a car accident, Bennett resigned from the European Tour at the start of 2009. He has since become a caddie initially for Bernd Wiesberger, and later for Trish Johnson on the Ladies European Tour.

In 2017 he was appointed club professional at Chestfield Golf Club in Kent.

Amateur wins
1992 British Youths Open Amateur Championship
1994 Australian Amateur, Lytham Trophy

Professional wins (11)

European Tour wins (1)

European Tour playoff record (1–1)

Challenge Tour wins (7)

Jamega Pro Golf Tour wins (3)

Results in major championships

Note: Bennett only played in The Open Championship.

LA = Low amateur
CUT = missed the half-way cut
"T" = tied

Team appearances
European Amateur Team Championship (representing England): 1993
Eisenhower Trophy (representing Great Britain & Ireland): 1994
St Andrews Trophy (representing Great Britain & Ireland): 1994 (winners)

See also
2006 European Tour Qualifying School graduates
List of golfers with most Challenge Tour wins

References

External links

English male golfers
European Tour golfers
People from Ashford, Surrey
Sportspeople from Aylesbury
1971 births
Living people